Desiree Ellis (born 14 March 1963) is a South African soccer manager and former player. She currently coaches the South Africa women's national team. She is a founding member of the Banyana Banyana and the second captain of the national team. She was awarded Confederation of African Football Women's Coach of the Year in 2018 after her team finished second place in the African Women Cup of Nations and qualifying for the Women's World Cup for the first time. During her club career she played as a midfielder for Spurs Ladies among other teams.She is honored to have won the African Women Cup of Nations in 2022 after South Africa's long run for a win in the finals

Early life
Ellis grew up in Salt River in the 1970s. Stayed at her Grandmother's place after school as both her parents, father Ernest, (d. 1989) and mother Natalie worked during the day. There were no women's clubs back then and she played soccer with boys and her cousins. After school she'd drop her school bag, change her clothes and run outside to her waiting teammates. Her father often threatened to send her to school barefoot because she'd ruin her shoes while playing soccer.

Club career
Ellis eventually found another women's club,(Athlone Celtic was the first club she played for) Spurs Ladies while she still worked at a butchery in Lansdowne mixing spices. She once left town with the club over a weekend, promising her employers that she'd return in time for work but the vehicle the team was travelling in broke down on the way home, making her fail to arrive on time. Consequently, Ellis got fired.

Outside football
Ellis had many administration occupations during her playing career. She was the vice-president of Western Province Women's Football Association from 1994 to 1995 and later the PRO of the association from 1996 to 1997. She worked as a Chief Librarian at a photo agency, Touchline in 2001.

International career
Ellis went for trials for the national team and passed and would feature in the team's first international match. She debuted against Swaziland at the age of 30 on 30 May 1993 in a 14–0 win. Ellis scored a hat-trick, as did two other players. During the 1995 World Cup qualifiers, South Africa beat Zimbabwe, Zambia and Angola on aggregate, 10–1, 11–5 and 6–4 but lost to Nigeria 11–2. When South Africa hosted the 2000 African Women's Championship, she captained the side to a runner-up finish. In 2000, Ellis was nominated alongside Mercy Akide and Florence Omagbemi for African Woman Footballer of the Year. She was recognized for her services to soccer the same year when she received a Silver Presidential Sports Award. She also led Banyana Banyana to the 2002 COSAFA Cup victory. In her 32 caps for South Africa she won 23 matches, lost seven and drew two. She retired from soccer in April 2002 at the age of 38.

Post retirement career
Ellis can be seen on TV as a soccer commentator and a pundit on local television station e-TV. She was an ambassador for the 2010 FIFA World Cup. She also worked at Gallo Images as a picture editor.

Coaching career 
Ellis was appointed interim manager of the South Africa women's national football team in 2016 after Vera Pauw resigned following the team's group stage exit at the 2016 Olympics. Ellis was appointed head coach in February 2018 and coached the team, then ranked 50th in the world, to a second-place finish in the Africa Women Cup of Nations, losing to 11-time champions Nigeria on penalty kicks in the final; nonetheless, by finishing second, South Africa qualified to its first-ever FIFA Women's World Cup in 2019. She was awarded Confederation of African Football Women's Coach of the Year in 2018, 2019 and 2022.

Ellis coached Banyana Banyana to their maiden Africa Cup of Nations victory in Morocco in 2022.

Honours

Player 
South Africa

COSAFA Women's Championship: 2002
 Women's Africa Cup of Nations runners-up: 2000

Individual
Mobil Achievement Award by WP Sportswriters: 1980
SAFA Women's Inter-provincials: 1986, 1989, 1992
Foschini Cape Woman Football Player of the Year: 1989, 1993
WP Player of the Year: 1983, 1993
Sanlam Sports Star of the Month (November): 2000
SAFA Special Recognition Gold Award: 2001
Presidential Sports Silver Award: 2001
Mandisa Shiceka Role Model Award by ANC Youth League: 2001

Manager 
South Africa

 COSAFA Women's Championship: 2018, 2019, 2020
 Women's Africa Cup of Nations: 2022, runners-up: 2018
 Aisha Buhari Cup: 2021

Individual

 Sports Minster's Excellence Award: 2017
Confederation of African Football Women's Coach of the Year: 2018, 2019, 2022

References

Living people
1963 births
Women's association football midfielders
South African women's soccer players
South Africa women's international soccer players
South African expatriate soccer players
South Africa women's national soccer team managers
Soccer players from Cape Town
2019 FIFA Women's World Cup managers
South African soccer managers
Female association football managers